Jutras may have several meanings :

Claude Jutra: an award-winning French Canadian filmmaker
Jutra Award: Film awards formerly given in the Canadian province of Quebec, named after the filmmaker and now known as Prix Iris
The Claude Jutra Award: An award formerly given by the Canadian Genie Awards for a director's first feature film and now known as the Canadian Screen Award for Best First Feature
Benoît Jutras, composer
Normand Jutras, a politician
René Jutras, a politician
Manon Jutras, an athlete
Paul Jutras, a Canadian film editor